Quentin V. Long (1918 – February 5, 1997) was an American politician. He served as a Democratic member of the Florida House of Representatives.

Life and career 
Long attended Miami Edison Senior High School and served in the United States Navy during World War II.

In 1962, Long was elected to the Florida House of Representatives.

Long died in February 1997 in Alachua, Florida, at the age of 78.

References 

1918 births
1997 deaths
Democratic Party members of the Florida House of Representatives
20th-century American politicians